Tala Yousef Abdul Kareem Al Barghouthy (born 11 April 2002) is a Jordanian footballer who plays as a forward for the Jordan women's national team.

References 

2002 births
Living people
Jordanian women's footballers
Jordan women's international footballers
Women's association football forwards
Sportspeople from Amman